Mangalam Publications (India) Private Limited, is an Indian publishing company in Kottayam, Kerala, India. It publishes online daily newspaper and weekly magazines such as Mangalam Weekly, Kanyaka and Cinema Mangalam in Malayalam. They also publish some magazines in Kannada language. Printed from Kottayam, Kochi, Kozhikode, Thiruvananthapuram, Idukki, Kannur and Thrissur, Mangalam is the sixth most circulated Malayalam daily.

The company was founded by M. C. Varghese in 1969 as a monthly journal, with a circulation of 250 copies. Later it became a weekly magazine.

Publications

Malayalam

 Mangalam Weekly
 Kanyaka Magazine - women's fortnightly
 Cinema Mangalam - weekly film weekly

Kannada

 Mangala
 Balamangala

See also
Dinkan
List of Malayalam-language newspapers
List of Malayalam-language periodicals
List of newspapers in India

References

External links 

News about Mangalam Controversy
Scoop Site

Daily newspapers published in India
Malayalam-language newspapers
Publications established in 1969
Magazine publishing companies of India
1969 establishments in Kerala
Kottayam